The 2009 British Grand Prix (formally the 2009 Formula 1 Santander British Grand Prix) was a Formula One motor race held at the Silverstone Circuit in Northamptonshire, United Kingdom, on 21 June 2009. The 60-lap race was the eighth round of the 2009 Formula One season. It was scheduled to be the last British Grand Prix to be held at Silverstone, before the event moved to Donington Park for the 2010 season. However, due to Donington being unable to raise the required funds the event returned to Silverstone again in 2010, on a new layout. The race was won by Sebastian Vettel, who started on pole, with championship leader Jenson Button finishing in sixth position.

Report

Background

Home driver Jenson Button led the Drivers' Championship by 26 points from Brawn teammate Rubens Barrichello. Barrichello was 8 points clear of Red Bull's Sebastian Vettel, who lay 1.5 points ahead of his teammate, Mark Webber.

Brawn GP led the Constructors' Championship by 39.5 points from Red Bull Racing and were a further 24 points ahead of Japanese manufacturer Toyota.

Home favourite and reigning World Champion, Lewis Hamilton, had won the previous year's event for McLaren. As well as Hamilton, the British Grand Prix has a history of native success. Down the years these include wins for David Coulthard, Johnny Herbert, Damon Hill, Nigel Mansell, John Watson, James Hunt, Jackie Stewart, Jim Clark and Stirling Moss. Britain was to be represented this year by Hamilton and Jenson Button.

Due to the continuing political dispute between the Formula 1 Teams Association (FOTA), the FIA and Formula 1 Management (FOM), there was talk that the teams against the proposed 2010 season budget cap would not compete in the 2010 season.

Other former British GP winners in the field were Ferrari's Kimi Räikkönen, Renault's Fernando Alonso and Brawn GP driver Rubens Barrichello.

Practice and qualifying

Sebastian Vettel was fastest in both the first and second practice sessions, with Mark Webber coming second in both. The final session saw Nico Rosberg top the time charts.

Qualifying began in some of the coolest conditions experienced all year, with an air temperature of just . The session was mostly dominated by the Red Bull drivers, until a late flying lap by Kazuki Nakajima saw him fastest by a tenth of a second. The session ended prematurely in the final minute when Adrian Sutil crashed heavily at Abbey, forcing reigning World Champion Lewis Hamilton to abort his final lap and leaving him nineteenth with Giancarlo Fisichella, Sébastien Bourdais, Sutil and Sébastien Buemi also eliminated. Sutil's accident was later found to have been a result of brake failure.

The second session did not begin until the remains of Sutil's car were removed from the circuit, with track conditions remaining constant and Red Bull continuing their pace, with Mark Webber remaining unchallenged for most of the session with teammate Sebastian Vettel only out-pacing him on his final run. Championship leader Jenson Button only narrowly missed elimination, setting the eight-fastest time at the end of the session when he had previously been sitting eleventh. Felipe Massa, Robert Kubica, Heikki Kovalainen, Nelson Piquet Jr. and Nick Heidfeld were all eliminated.

The third and final session saw most of the cars switching to the softer option tyre. Sebastian Vettel took pole from Rubens Barrichello, with Webber third. Button qualified sixth – his worst of the season – after Nakajima found some of his first-session pace to steal fifth place out from under him, resulting in his career-best qualifying position. When the weights of each car was published post-qualifying, it emerged that Vettel was 9 kg heavier than the Brawn of Barrichello and 7 kg heavier than teammate Webber. After qualifying, it was announced that BMW Sauber would be abandoning their KERS program for good.

Race

Vettel and Red Bull dominated the Grand Prix, with the young German driving away from the field from pole position, often pulling away from Barrichello at the rate of one second per lap.

It was a good day for the Red Bull drivers from the moment the lights went out, with championship rival Button dropping down to ninth position at the end of the first lap after a poor start. Fellow home driver Hamilton was having more success, albeit from 19th on the grid, gaining four positions in the first two laps. The mixed-up race order was perhaps reflective of the season as a whole, with the only World Champions in the field – Raikkonen, Alonso and Hamilton – at one point battling for 13th, 14th and 15th positions.

At the front of the race while Vettel was setting fastest laps, teammate Mark Webber was unable to pass Rubens Barrichello for second position until the Brazilian pitted on lap 20. Webber pitted a lap later but produced a good enough in-lap to emerge from the pits ahead of Barrichello. Nico Rosberg also benefited from the pit stop phase, emerging in fourth position, ahead of Felipe Massa.

Hamilton's eventful race at the back of the field continued, running off track on several occasions. He was able to pass teammate Heikki Kovalainen who had just emerged from the pits on lap 34. The following lap, Sebastian Bourdais attempted a similar manoeuvre at the Abbey chicane, however the Toro Rosso driver was less successful, colliding with the Finn and causing both cars to retire.

At the second round of pit-stops, Button was able to take advantage of a long middle stint to move ahead of Raikkonen and Trulli and up to sixth position, behind Massa, who had in-turn leap-frogged Rosberg for fourth. Button was on the faster tyre compound and pressured both cars until the finish, but was unable to pass Rosberg despite being just 0.3 seconds behind the German at the start of the last lap. Rosberg was himself just 0.8 seconds behind Massa.

As Vettel took the chequered flag, he was 15.1 seconds ahead of teammate Webber, who was a further 25.9 seconds ahead of Barrichello. Jarno Trulli finished in 7th ahead of Raikkonen, who had to endure late pressure from Trulli's teammate Timo Glock.  Hamilton finished a lowly 16th.

Post-race

The combination of the fast sweeping circuit suiting the updated Red Bull RB5 and cold conditions hampering the Brawn produced what was a disappointing result for pace-setting Brawn. Button's championship lead was reduced to a still substantial 23 points over Barrichello, who was now just 2 points ahead of Vettel. Webber was a further 3.5 points behind, while Brawn's Constructors' Championship lead was also cut.

Red Bull's Christian Horner declared his team could mount a serious title challenge following the successful showing of their updated car, claiming it should be quick on the remaining circuits. Vettel declared his car to be "fantastic" while Mark Webber praised the team but admitted a mistake in qualifying cost him any chance of winning. The race also saw Vettel claim his first "hat trick", with pole, fastest lap and the win. Button dismissed talk of Red Bull now having a sizeable advantage, saying Brawn looked weaker than they were because of the cool conditions.

There were contrasting emotions for 2008 title contenders Felipe Massa and Lewis Hamilton, Massa describing his race from 11th to 4th as good as winning the race while Hamilton said he was pushing his hardest despite finishing 16th.

Away from the track action, the talk of the paddock was the threat of a breakaway series, with FIA President Max Mosley confident of a solution to the dispute. Commercial rights holder Bernie Ecclestone admitted for the first time the British Grand Prix would be returning to Silverstone if Donington Park was unable to host the 2010 event.

Classification

Cars that used KERS are marked with "‡"

Qualifying

Race

Championship standings after the race 

Drivers' Championship standings

Constructors' Championship standings

 Note: Only the top five positions are included for both sets of standings.

See also 
 2009 Silverstone GP2 Series round

References

External links

 Official results at Formula1.com

British
British Grand Prix
Grand Prix
British Grand Prix